is a Japanese football player who has played for the J2 League team Ventforet Kofu.

Career statistics
Updated to 24 February 2019.

References

External links
Profile at Sagan Tosu

1986 births
Living people
Meiji University alumni
Association football people from Ōita Prefecture
Japanese footballers
J1 League players
J2 League players
Tokyo Verdy players
Yokohama F. Marinos players
Yokohama FC players
Kashiwa Reysol players
Sagan Tosu players
Ventforet Kofu players
Association football defenders